The Great Victoria Desert is a sparsely populated desert ecoregion and interim Australian bioregion in Western Australia and South Australia.

History
In 1875, British-born Australian explorer Ernest Giles became the first European to cross the desert. He named the desert after the then-reigning monarch, Queen Victoria. In 1891,  David Lindsey's expedition traveled across this area from north to south. Frank Hann was looking for gold in this area between 1903 and 1908. Len Beadell explored the area in the 1960s.

Location and description

The Great Victoria is the largest desert in Australia, and consists of many small sandhills, grassland plains, areas with a closely packed surface of pebbles (called desert pavement or gibber plains), and salt lakes. The Western Australian mulga shrublands ecoregion lies to the west, the Little Sandy Desert to the northwest, the Gibson Desert and the Central Ranges xeric shrublands to the north, the Tirari-Sturt stony desert to the east, and the Nullarbor Plain to the south separates it from the Southern Ocean. Thunderstorms are relatively common in the Great Victoria Desert, with an average of 15–20 thunderstorms yearly.

The Great Victoria desert is a World Wildlife Fund ecoregion and an Interim Biogeographic Regionalisation for Australia region of the same name.

Habitation
The majority of people living in the region are Indigenous Australians from different groups, including the Kogara, the Mirning and the Pitjantjatjara. Aboriginal populations have been increasing in this region. Young Indigenous adults from the Great Victoria Desert region work in the Wilurarra Creative programs to maintain and develop their culture.

Despite its isolated location, the Great Victoria is bisected by very rough tracks, including the Connie Sue Highway and the Anne Beadell Highway. Human activity has included some mining and nuclear weapons testing.

Flora
Only the hardiest of plants can survive in much of this environment. Between the sand ridges, the areas of wooded steppe consist of Eucalyptus gongylocarpa, Eucalyptus youngiana, and Acacia aneura (mulga) shrubs scattered over areas of resilient spinifex grasses, particularly Triodia basedowii.

Fauna
The wildlife that adapted to these harsh conditions included few large birds or mammals. However, the desert does sustain many types of lizards, including the vulnerable great desert skink (Egernia kintorei), the Central Ranges taipan (discovered in 2007), and a number of small marsupials, including the endangered sandhill dunnart (Sminthopsis psammophila) and the crest-tailed mulgara (Dasycercus cristicauda). One way to survive here is to burrow into the sands, as a number of the desert's animals, including the southern marsupial mole (Notoryctes typhlops), and the water-holding frog do. Birds include the chestnut-breasted whiteface (Aphelocephala pectoralis) found on the eastern edge of the desert and the malleefowl of Mamungari Conservation Park. Predators of the desert include the dingo (as the desert is north of the Dingo Fence) and two large monitor lizards, the perentie (Varanus giganteus) and the sand goanna (Varanus gouldii).

Conservation and threats
As this area has had very limited use for agriculture, many habitats remain largely undisturbed. 31% of the desert is in protected areas, including Mamungari Conservation Park (formerly known as Unnamed Conservation Park) in South Australia, a large area of pristine arid zone wilderness, which possesses cultural significance and is one of the 14 World Biosphere Reserves in Australia. Habitat is also preserved in the large Aboriginal local government area of Anangu Pitjantjatjara Yankunytjatjara in South Australia and in the Great Victoria Desert Nature Reserve of Western Australia. Protected areas include:
 Antara-Sandy Bore Indigenous Protected Area
 Apara-Makiri-Punti Indigenous Protected Area
 De La Poer Range Nature Reserve
 Gawler Ranges National Park
 Gawler Ranges Conservation Park
 Great Victoria Desert Nature Reserve
 Kalka-Pipalyatjara Indigenous Protected Area
 Lake Gairdner National Park
 Mamungari Conservation Park
 Mount Willoughby Indigenous Protected Area
 Neale Junction Nature Reserve
 Ngaanyatjarra Indigenous Protected Area
 Nullarbor Regional Reserve
 Plumridge Lakes Nature Reserve
 Pureba Conservation Park
 Queen Victoria Spring Nature Reserve
 Tallaringa Conservation Park	
 Walalkara Indigenous Protected Area
 Watarru Indigenous Protected Area
 Yellabinna Regional Reserve
 Yellabinna Wilderness Protection Area
 Yeo Lake Nature Reserve
 Yumbarra Conservation Park

The nuclear weapons trials carried out by the United Kingdom at Maralinga and Emu Field in the 1950s and early 1960s have left areas contaminated with plutonium-239 and other radioactive material.

See also

 Deserts of Australia
 List of deserts by area
Tallaringa Conservation Park

References

External links

Online natural history of Great Victoria Desert

Further reading
 
 
 
 
 

 
Deserts and xeric shrublands
Deserts of Western Australia
Deserts of South Australia
Ecoregions of South Australia
Ecoregions of Western Australia
Ergs
Goldfields-Esperance
IBRA regions